Matías Nahuel Borgogno (born 21 August 1998) is an Argentine professional footballer who plays as a goalkeeper for Vélez Sarsfield.

Career
Borgogno spent his early years in San Francisco with Belgrano and Sportivo Belgrano, before heading to Buenos Aires with Vélez Sarsfield in 2013. He initially made a competitive senior teamsheet in the 2017–18 campaign, as he went unused for matches against San Martín and Colón under Gabriel Heinze in May 2018. He signed his first professional contract in the succeeding June. He was on the bench a further eight times across the next two years. Borgogno's senior debut arrived on 28 November 2020 in the Copa de la Liga Profesional against Gimnasia y Esgrima, featuring for the full duration of a home loss.

Career statistics
.

Notes

References

External links

1998 births
Living people
People from San Francisco, Córdoba
Argentine people of Italian descent
Argentine footballers
Association football goalkeepers
Argentine Primera División players
Club Atlético Vélez Sarsfield footballers
Sportspeople from Córdoba Province, Argentina